Wilfried Brookhuis (born 16 October 1961 in Oldenzaal, Overijssel) is a retired football goalkeeper from the Netherlands, who played professional football for NEC Nijmegen for eleven years (1985–1996).

Managerial career
Brookhuis joined NEC as a goalkeeper coach in 2004. In summer 2013 he was appointed caretaker manager alongside Ron de Groot after Alex Pastoor was sacked. Brookhuis had been caretaker three times before, after the club fired Cees Lok in 2005, Dwight Lodeweges in 2009 and in August 2013.

In March 2018, Brookhuis was hit by a brain haemorrhage but the club later announced, that his situation was stable and not life-threatening. He was then temporarily replaced by Gábor Babos for his position as a goalkeeper coach. He returned to NEC in the July 2018 and was in a reintegration process and continued in his position, which included coaching the goalkeepers and policy-related activities for goalkeeper training for the first team, Jong NEC and the youth academy.

On 3 April 2019, he was appointed as caretaker manager for Jong NEC (the U21 squad or reserve team of NEC) after Ron de Groot was promoted to first team manager.

References

External links
 Profile - NEC 
  Profile

1961 births
Living people
People from Oldenzaal
Dutch footballers
Association football goalkeepers
De Graafschap players
NEC Nijmegen players
Eredivisie players
Quick '20 players
Footballers from Overijssel
NEC Nijmegen non-playing staff
Dutch football managers
NEC Nijmegen managers